John W. Bouchelle (1807 – December 13, 1898) was an American politician and farmer from Maryland. He served as a member of the Maryland House of Delegates, representing Cecil County, in 1844.

Early life
John W. Bouchelle was born in 1807 in Bohemia Manor (later Chesapeake City, Maryland), to Alice (née Cannon) and Peter Bouchelle. His ancestor Lege de Bouchelle settled in Bohemia Manor in 1640.

Career
Bouchelle was a farmer. Bouchelle was a Democrat. Bouchelle served as a member of the Maryland House of Delegates, representing Cecil County, in 1844.

Personal life
Bouchelle married Hannah L. Bayard. They had fifteen children, including Caradora, Mrs. William Kaisner, Mrs. Joshua Craig, George and Augustus J. His daughter Caradora married state delegate Joseph H. Steele. His grandson was state delegate John W. Bouchelle.

Bouchelle died on December 13, 1898, at his son Augustus's home in Bohemia Manor. He was buried at Bethel Cemetery in Chesapeake City.

References

Date of birth unknown
1807 births
1898 deaths
People from Chesapeake City, Maryland
Democratic Party members of the Maryland House of Delegates
19th-century American politicians